Mad (stylized as MAD) is the fourth extended play by South Korean boy band Got7, released on September 29, 2015 by JYP Entertainment. The song "If You Do" was used to promote the EP as the lead single.

Track listing

Reissue
The reissue of the album, titled Mad Winter Edition, was released on November 23. It consists of the same track list, but also includes 3 new tracks: "Confession Song", "Everyday" and "The Star".

Reissue track listing

Chart performance

Album chart

Sales for "Mad"

Sales for MAD Winter Edition

Singles
"If You Do"

"Confession Song"

Music programs

References 

2015 EPs
Dance-pop EPs
Korean-language EPs
JYP Entertainment EPs
Genie Music EPs
Got7 EPs